Acústico (Spanish "acoustic") may refer to:

Music
 Acústico (Ednita Nazario album), 2002
 Acústico (La 5ª Estación album), 2005
 En Acústico, a 2011 album by Pablo Alborán

See also

 Acústico Vol. II, 2002 album by Ednita Nazario
 Acústico MTV (disambiguation)
 Acustica (disambiguation)
 Acoustic (disambiguation)